Kevin O'Brien is an American author.

He grew up in Chicago's North Shore, but now moved to Seattle, Washington in 1980. After attending New Trier East High School, he studied journalism at Marquette University.

References

External links 
 
Kensington Publishing: Kevin O'Brien author page 

Living people
20th-century American novelists
21st-century American novelists
American male novelists
Writers from Chicago
Marquette University alumni
Year of birth uncertain
20th-century American male writers
21st-century American male writers
Novelists from Illinois
Year of birth missing (living people)